The Men's 400m individual medley event at the 2010 South American Games was held on March 29, with the heats at 11:02 and the Final at 18:25.

Medalists

Records

Results

Heats

Final

References
Heats
Final

Medley 400m M